Mbangala (Bangala) is a Bantu language of Angola.

References

Yaka languages
Languages of the Democratic Republic of the Congo